Alfredo Marcos da Silva Junior, known as Marcão (born 2 April 1986), is a Brazilian professional footballer who most recently played for Belgian club Westerlo, as a striker.

Career
Omolo has played club football in Brazil, United Arab Emirates and Belgium for Vila Aurora, Boa, Al Dhafra, Trindade, São Carlos and Westerlo.

References

1986 births
Living people
Brazilian footballers
Association football forwards
K.V.C. Westerlo players
Footballers from Rio de Janeiro (city)